Material extrusion-based additive manufacturing (EAM) represents one of the seven categories of 3d printing processes, defined by the ISO international standard 17296-2. While it is mostly used for plastics, under the name of FDM or FFF, it can also be used for metals and ceramics. In this AM process category, the feedstock materials are mixtures of a polymeric binder (from 40% to 60% by volume) and a fine grain solid powder of metal or ceramic materials. Similar type of feedstock is also used in the Metal Injection Molding (MIM) and in the Ceramic Injection Molding (CIM) processes. The extruder pushes the material towards a heated nozzle thanks to
 the controlled axial movement of a piston inside a heated barrel,
or the controlled axial rotation of a screw inside a heated barrel,
 or the controlled rotation of two feeding rollers.

History

R&D developments 
 In 1995, the Fraunhofer IFAM designed a Rapid Prototyping system, starting from a powder‐binder mixture which is squeezed out through a computer‐controlled nozzle. Parts are manufactured layer by layer and the “green parts” are debinded and sintered to reach their final density; IFAM restarted this line of research in 2017;
 In 1998, the concept of hybrid, additive/subtractive Shape Deposition Manufacturing for ceramics was proposed and tested at Carnegie Mellon University
 In year 2000, a system was developed at Rutgers University for the solid freeform fabrication of multiple ceramic actuators and sensors, starting from green ceramic filaments
 In 2005, a system was development at the Drexel University, based on material extrusion, consisting of a mini-extruder with a single screw mounted on a high-precision positioning system, fed with bulk material in granulated form (pellets);
 In 2015, a 3d printing machine was developed at Politecnico di Milano for MIM metals and CIM ceramics, based on extrusion of pellets with a stationary piston-based extruder over a reversed Delta Robot table;

Commercial developments 
After year 2015, some commercial providers of the technology have started proposing their product, mostly for metal applications, e.g.:
 Metal X by Markforged,
 Studio System by Desktop Metal,
 ExAM by AIM3d.

Reference List 

Manufacturing
3D printing
3D printing processes
Fused filament fabrication